Harold J. Earle (March 4, 1884 – March 10, 1954) was a merchant and politician in Newfoundland. He represented Fogo in the Newfoundland House of Assembly from 1932 to 1934 as a United Newfoundland Party member.

The son of Henry J. Earle, he was born in Fogo and was educated at Bishop Feild College and in England. In 1917, he took over the management of the family company Earle Sons and Co. The company was involved in the export of seafood and retail sales of groceries and fishing equipment; it operated in Fogo, Twillingate, Herring Neck and Change Islands. Earle was elected to the Newfoundland assembly in 1932.

He died in Fogo at the age of 70. The Earle business continued to operate until 1974 when it closed due to declining fish stocks.

References 

1884 births
1954 deaths
People from Fogo Island, Newfoundland and Labrador
United Newfoundland Party MHAs
Bishop Feild School alumni
Dominion of Newfoundland politicians